Sons of Norway is a 2011 Norwegian drama film directed by Jens Lien.

External links 
 

2011 films
Norwegian drama films
Films set in Bærum
Films set in the 1970s
2011 drama films
2010s Norwegian-language films